Un giorno speciale (also known as A Special Day) is a 2012 Italian drama film directed by Francesca Comencini. The film was selected to compete for the Golden Lion at the 69th Venice International Film Festival.

Cast
 Filippo Scicchitano as Marco
 Giulia Valentini as Gina
 Roberto Infascelli as Autista deposito
 Antonio Zavatteri as On. Balestra (as Antonio Giancarlo Zavatteri)
 Daniela Del Priore as Marta
 Rocco Miglionicco as Rocco

References

External links
 

2012 films
2012 drama films
Italian drama films
2010s Italian-language films
Films directed by Francesca Comencini
2010s Italian films